Florentiamyidae is a family of extinct rodents from North America.  They are part of the Superfamily Geomyoidea according to R. L. Carroll 1988.  They are known to have existed 33.3 to 15.97 mya.  They are known from the Miocene of United States, Harrisonian of United States, Arikareean of United States, and Oligocene of Canada.  Four fossil specimens from the Arikareean were obtained at the John Day Fossil Beds in Oregon.

References

Geomyoid rodents
Eocene rodents
Eocene odd-toed ungulates
Eocene mammals of North America
Paleogene geology of Oregon
Prehistoric rodent families
John Day Fossil Beds National Monument
Extinct rodents
Extinct mammals of North America
Eocene first appearances
Eocene extinctions
Rupelian first appearances
Miocene extinctions